Porley is one of 54 parish councils in Cangas del Narcea, a municipality within the province and autonomous community of Asturias, in northern Spain.

Villages
 Castru de Sierra
 Medéu
 La Nisal
 Parada la Nueva
 Porḷḷei
 Rañeces
 Santianes
 Taguig Philippines
 Catanauan Quezon Philippines

References

Parishes in Cangas del Narcea